Route 168 is a  state highway in the southern part of New Jersey. The route's southern terminus is an interchange with Route 42 and the Atlantic City Expressway in the Turnersville section of Washington Township, Gloucester County. The northern terminus is an intersection with County Route 603 (CR 603) on the border of Camden and Woodlynne in Camden County. At this point, the route continues toward downtown Camden as CR 605. Route 168 follows the Black Horse Pike for most of its length, running through suburban areas in Gloucester Township, Runnemede, Bellmawr, and Mount Ephraim. It intersects many major roads, including the Route 42 freeway in Gloucester Township, Route 41 in Runnemede, the New Jersey Turnpike and Interstate 295 (I-295) in Bellmawr, Route 76C (an access ramp to I-76 and I-676) in Haddon Township, and U.S. Route 130 (US 130) in Camden.

What is now Route 168 runs along the Black Horse Pike, a turnpike established in 1855 that was to run from Camden to Atlantic City. In 1927, Route 42 was designated along this portion of road as part of its route between Camden and McKee City. In the 1940s, a freeway was proposed for Route 42 between Turnersville and the Camden area; construction began on this freeway in the 1950s. After this freeway was entirely completed in 1959, the Route 42 designation was moved to it and the former alignment of Route 42 along the Black Horse Pike north of Turnersville became Route 168.

Route description

Route 168 begins at an interchange with the west end of the Atlantic City Expressway, which feeds into Route 42 in the Turnersville section of Washington Township, Gloucester County; the North–South Freeway begins at that interchange, carrying Route 42 and through traffic from Atlantic City towards Camden. Meanwhile, Route 168 continues on the old Black Horse Pike as a four-lane divided surface road, with the route officially beginning at the intersection with Hurff Lane. Access from Route 168 south to Route 42 is provided via a one-way ramp continuing from the southern terminus of Route 168. However, northbound traffic from Route 42 must take the ramp to the freeway and exit immediately from the collector/distributor road onto northbound CR 705 to access Route 168.

From here, Route 168 continues north through commercial areas before crossing the Big Timber Creek into Gloucester Township, Camden County, where it becomes a three-lane road with a center left-turn lane and immediately intersects CR 673, which provides access to Camden County College. The road heads west of the Gloucester Premium Outlets and passes through suburban areas of homes and businesses, coming to a junction with CR 747. From here, the route heads through the Blackwood section of Gloucester Township, where it intersects CR 534. The route leaves the Blackwood area and comes to an intersection with CR 706. The road passes businesses past this intersection as a three-lane road with two southbound lanes and one northbound lane before coming to an interchange with Route 42. At this interchange, there is full access between northbound Route 42 and Route 168 and between southbound Route 42 and Route 168.

Past the Route 42 interchange, the route intersects CR 676 and narrows to two lanes as it heads through commercial areas of Hilltop. It gains a center left-turn lane again before it crosses over CR 681 and the North Branch of the Big Timber Creek. Route 168 comes to a junction with CR 683 and enters the Glendora section of Gloucester Township, where it heads into residential and commercial areas. Here, the route intersects CR 682. At the intersection with CR 544, the road crosses into Runnemede and becomes a two-lane road. Route 168 crosses Route 41 and heads through the center of Runnemede. The center-left turn lane along the route returns before it comes to a ramp for the New Jersey Turnpike on the border of Runnemede and Bellmawr. Past here, Route 168 passes more businesses and crosses CR 659. A short distance later, the route comes to an interchange with I-295, where it becomes a four-lane undivided road.

The route forms the border between Mount Ephraim to the west and Haddon Heights to the east past this interchange and intersects CR 654 and CR 658. At the intersection with the latter, Route 168 entirely enters Mount Ephraim and crosses CR 551 Spur. Past this intersection, the road enters a mix of residential and commercial areas and comes to a junction with CR 660. Upon crossing Audubon Lake, Route 168 forms the border between Haddon Township to the west and Audubon to the east and becomes a divided highway again with several jughandles. The route crosses CR 635, where it becomes the border of Haddon Township and Audubon Park as a six-lane divided highway. An interchange with Route 76C provides access to I-76, I-676, and the Walt Whitman Bridge to and from the southbound direction of Route 168.

Immediately past this interchange, Route 168 narrows to four lanes and intersects CR 650, crossing the Newton Creek, where it forms the border between Camden to the west and Haddon Township to the east. Here, the route crosses US 130 at a channelized intersection. After crossing over US 130, Route 168 drops the Black Horse Pike designation and becomes Mount Ephraim Avenue as is runs between the Fairview section of Camden and the West Collingswood Extension section of Haddon Township. Here, the route narrows to a two-lane undivided road and passes through urban areas. It crosses over CR 630 before it becomes a three-lane road with a center left-turn lane and entirely enters Camden. The road crosses the North Branch of the Newton Creek, where it forms the border between Camden to the west and Woodlynne to the east. It becomes a four-lane undivided road that passes through industrial sectors before crossing Conrail Shared Assets Operations' Beesleys Point Secondary railroad line and heading past more urban development. Route 168 ends at the intersection with CR 603, where Mount Ephraim Avenue continues north as CR 605 to downtown Camden, ending at an intersection with CR 561.

History

The predecessor to today's Route 168 was a set of Lenni Lenape trails that followed the Timber Creek. In 1855, the Camden and Blackwoodstown Turnpike Company was established by entrepreneurs who had helped create the White Horse Pike to build a gravel road that would run from Camden south to Blackwoodtown and eventually to Atlantic City; this road became the Black Horse Pike. The creation of the Black Horse Pike led to the development of several towns along the route. The Black Horse Pike was transferred from the turnpike company to the county in 1903, at a time where many private turnpikes would become public roads. In the 1927 New Jersey state highway renumbering, this portion of the Black Horse Pike was designated as part of a new route, Route 42, that was to run from Ferry Avenue in Camden south to Route 48 (now US 40) in McKee City. This portion of road retained the Route 42 designation in the 1953 New Jersey state highway renumbering.

In the late 1940s, a freeway was planned to bypass this portion of Route 42, with right-of-way acquisition and construction starting in the 1950s. This new freeway, called the North–South Freeway, opened between Bellmawr and the Black Horse Pike in Blackwood in 1958 and from Blackwood to Turnersville in 1959. With the opening of the freeway, the Route 42 designation was moved to the North–South Freeway and the Black Horse Pike between Turnersville and Camden became Route 168.

Major intersections

See also

References

External links

Speed Limits for State Roads: Route 168

168
168
168